John Thomas Cahill (1 June 1895 – 9 October 1972) was an Australian rules footballer who played with Carlton in the Victorian Football League (VFL).

Originally from Brunswick, Cahill transferred to Williamstown for the 1923 season and played 10 games without kicking a goal before crossing to Carlton Districts in 1924. From there he was recruited by Carlton the following season.

Notes

External links 

Jack Cahill's profile at Blueseum

1895 births
1972 deaths
Carlton Football Club players
Australian rules footballers from Victoria (Australia)
Brunswick Football Club players
Williamstown Football Club players